The Ibanez K5 is the signature bass for metal band KoRn's bassist Reginald Fieldy Arvizu.

Specification
Fieldy from Korn has long played Ibanez Basses due to their low weight and signature sound; he got an endorsement deal with Ibanez soon after the breakthrough of KoRn. The five string K5 bass is designed by Ibanez along with Fieldy and includes a Mahogany body, Rosewood fretboard with 24 frets and a K5 inlay at the 12th fret, gold hardware, two active pickups and a Vari-Mid EQ. To achieve his signature sound Fieldy tunes his basses to A, D, G, C, F, turns the midrange all the way off and brings down the EQ all the way down at 180 Hz. This makes Fieldys bass stand out from the low end of the two seven string guitars instead of getting too muddy.

References 
 K5 info
 K5 review
 Fieldy interview

External links 
 Ibanez K5 specs
 Official Korn website

Electric bass guitars